Tat-Bikshik (Tat-Bikşek) is a rural locality (a village) in Novokilbakhtinsky Selsoviet, Kaltasinsky District, Bashkortostan, Russia. The population was 73 as of 2010. There is 1 street.

Geography 
Tat-Bikshik is located 35 km east of Kaltasy (the district's administrative centre) by road. Kuchash is the nearest rural locality.

References 

Rural localities in Kaltasinsky District